William D. F. Leushner (November 27, 1863 – October 25, 1935) was a competitive rifle shooter.

As a teenager he moved to Buffalo, New York, and joined the United States National Guard. In the 1908 Summer Olympics, he won a gold medal as a member of the U.S. military rifle team, having the highest individual score in the team competition. In the 1912 Summer Olympics, Leushner won a silver medal in the "team running deer, single shot 100 meters" competition (targets, not actual deer were used) and two bronze medals, finishing third in the "small-bore rifle teams 25 meters", and "small-bore rifle teams 50 meters". Leushner finished his Olympic career at the 1920 Olympics in Antwerp, Belgium, in which for the first time he failed to medal. He was three-time winner of the National Rifle Association of America's (N.R.A.) Members Trophy, winning the inaugural contest in 1901, and taking the title again in 1903 and 1908.

As a member of the U.S. National Guard, Leushner served on the Mexican border Pancho Villa Expedition with the 74th regiment. He was a marksmanship instructor at Camp Perry during the First World War and one year with the American Army of Occupation from 1919 to 1920. He was eventually made Lieutenant Colonel in the Reserve Corps.

Leushner died on October 25, 1935, aged 71, in his home in Buffalo. He had no children and was survived by his widow and several Canadian relatives.

Awards and medals
 Olympic gold medal 1908 military rifle team competition
 Olympic silver medal 1912 team running deer, single shot 
 Olympic bronze medal 1912 small-bore rifle teams 25 meters  
 Olympic bronze medal 1912 small-bore rifle teams 50 meters
 N.R.A. Member's trophy 1901
 N.R.A. Member's trophy 1903
 N.R.A. Member's trophy 1908

References

Sources
"Big reception for Yankee marksmen", Buffalo News (byline 'the news bureau' Washington, D.C.), July 17, 1908 
"W.F. Leushner, ill 10 days, dies", obituary, Buffalo News (no author given), October 26, 1935
Gene Korzelius, "Buffalo athletes won many world honors in sportdom", Buffalo News, October 11, 1930
David Wallechinsky, The Complete Book of the Olympics
"Noted soldier, Olympic star, taken by death" (obituary), Buffalo Courier (no byline), October 26, 1935

External links
Olympic stats posted on databaseOlympics.com

1863 births
1935 deaths
American male sport shooters
United States Distinguished Marksman
ISSF rifle shooters
Running target shooters
Sportspeople from Buffalo, New York
Sportspeople from Simcoe County
Olympic gold medalists for the United States in shooting
Olympic silver medalists for the United States in shooting
Olympic bronze medalists for the United States in shooting
Shooters at the 1908 Summer Olympics
Shooters at the 1912 Summer Olympics
Sportspeople from Ontario
Medalists at the 1908 Summer Olympics
Medalists at the 1912 Summer Olympics